

Homeland is a neighborhood in the northern part of Baltimore, Maryland, United States.  It is bounded roughly by Melrose Avenue on the north, Bellona Avenue on the east, Homeland Avenue on the south, and Charles Street on the west.

The Greater Homeland Historic District was listed on the National Register of Historic Places in 2001 with 1,616 contributing buildings.

Demographics 
97.8% of the houses in Homeland are occupied and 88.5% of that number are owner occupied.  According to the last census, 88% of the residents are white, 8.6% are black, 1.8% Asian and 1.5% are Hispanic. 20% of the white residents are reported as Irish, another 20% English, 17% German and 10% Polish.  The median family income is $136,383 with 1.2% of those in the workforce unemployed.  90.7% are high school graduates and 41% report having a graduate or professional degree.

Notable residents
 Ann Marie Doory - member of the Maryland House of Delegates
 Denise Dory - news anchor for ABC2 News
 Michael Middleton - professional lacrosse player
 Tom Marechek - professional lacrosse player
 Martin O'Malley - Maryland governor
 Alec Ross (author) - Democratic candidate for Maryland Governor
 Julia Marciari-Alexander - director of the Walters Art Museum
 John Marciari - author and curator at the Morgan Library and Museum

Government representation

References

External links 

 The Homeland Community Association
 HCA House photos
 "A Letter (Im) Perfect Neighborhood", Baltimore Sun, page 2b, Aug 20, 2006.
 , including photo from 2000, at Maryland Historical Trust, and accompanying map

Neighborhoods in Baltimore
Historic districts on the National Register of Historic Places in Baltimore
Northern Baltimore